The United States' Bob Bryan and Mike Bryan defeated France's Michaël Llodra and Jo-Wilfried Tsonga in the final, 6–4, 7–6(7–2) to win the gold medal in Men's Doubles tennis at the 2012 Summer Olympics. This completed a career Golden Slam for the Bryan brothers, making them the second men's doubles team to do so (after The Woodies of Australia; Canada's Daniel Nestor also won a career Golden Slam, but with multiple partners). Their victory also marked the first instance that both Olympic tennis doubles titles were claimed by siblings; fellow Americans Serena and Venus Williams won the women's doubles title. It was the record fourth gold medal for the United States in men's doubles. In the bronze-medal match, France's Julien Benneteau and Richard Gasquet defeated Spain's David Ferrer and Feliciano López, 7–6(7–4), 6–2. With France's silver and bronze, this was the first time since 1924 that one nation won multiple medals in the men's doubles.

The tournament was held at the All England Club in Wimbledon, London from 28 July to 4 August, making it the first Olympic grass court tournament since tennis was re-introduced to the Games. The event was run and organised by the International Olympic Committee (IOC) and the International Tennis Federation (ITF), and was part of the Association of Tennis Professionals tour. Matches were the best-of-three sets, and tie-breaks were in use for all sets except the third set. There were 32 teams from 25 countries.

Switzerland's Roger Federer and Stan Wawrinka were the reigning gold medalists from 2008, but they lost in the second round to Israel's Jonathan Erlich and Andy Ram.

Background

This was the 14th appearance of men's doubles tennis. The event has been held at every Summer Olympics where tennis has been on the program: from 1896 to 1924 and then from 1988 to the current program. A demonstration event was held in 1968.

The American pair of Bryan brothers, Bob Bryan and Mike Bryan, had been the top seed in 2004 but exited in the quarterfinals. They were again the number one seed in Beijing, but were defeated in the semifinals and took bronze. For a third Games, they were the top seed. Defending champions also Roger Federer and Stan Wawrinka returned. One of the French fourth-place team members, Michaël Llodra, also competed again, this time paired with Jo-Wilfried Tsonga. 2000 gold medalist Daniel Nestor (and career golden slam winner) of Canada competed for a fourth Games with his third different partner.

Colombia made its debut in the event. France and Great Britain each made their 11th appearance in the event, tied for most of all nations.

Qualification

Qualification for the men's doubles was primarily through the ATP ranking list of 11 June 2012. An additional restriction was that players had to have been available for two Davis Cup events between 2009 and 2012. Nations had been able to enter four players (two pairs) in the event since the 2004 Games. Each nation was limited to a total of 6 male players in the singles and doubles events combined, so nations with 4 singles players could add only 2 more in doubles. The men's doubles draw was 32 pairs (64 players), with most of the pairs coming from the singles event where nations had 2 or 4 players. Doubles players ranked 10 or better qualified directly and could bring any ranked singles or doubles player from their nation as their partner. The ITF allocated places based on ranking and continental and national representation (bringing the total number of male tennis players to 86).

Competition format

The competition was a single-elimination tournament with a bronze-medal match. All matches were best-of-three sets; the final was reduced from best-of-five in prior Games. Tiebreaks were used for any set before the third (fifth in the final) that reached 6–6.

Schedule

Seeds

Draw

Key

 INV = Tripartite invitation
 IP = ITF place
 Alt = Alternate

 w/o = Walkover
 r = Retired
 d = Defaulted

Finals

Top half

Bottom half

References

Men's Doubles Draw

2012
Tennis at the 2012 Summer Olympics
Men's events at the 2012 Summer Olympics